The French Sign Language (LSF, from langue des signes française) or Francosign family is a language family of sign languages which includes French Sign Language and American Sign Language.

The LSF family descends from Old French Sign Language (VLSF), which developed among the deaf community in Paris. The earliest mention of Old French Sign Language is by the abbé Charles-Michel de l'Épée in the late 18th century, but it could have existed for centuries prior. Several European sign languages, such as Russian Sign Language, derive from it, as does American Sign Language, established when French educator Laurent Clerc taught his language at the American School for the Deaf. Others, such as Spanish Sign Language, are thought to be related to French Sign Language even if they are not directly descendant from it.

Language family tree

Anderson (1979)
Anderson (1979) postulated the following classification of LSF and its relatives, with derivation from Medieval monks' sign systems, though some lineages are apparently traced by their manual alphabets and thus irrelevant for actual classification:
Monastic sign languages (described 1086)
"Southwest European" Sign Languages
Proto-Spanish
Spanish Sign Language (dictionary 1851)
Venezuelan Sign Language
Irish → Australian Catholic
Old Polish → Polish Sign Language
Old French Sign Language (VLSF, before l'Épée)
Eastern French: Old Danish (edu. 1807), Old German, German Evangelical (edu. 1779 Austria), Old Russian (edu. 1806)
Western French
Middle French Sign Language finger-spelling group: Netherlands (1780), Belgium (1793), Switzerland, Old French
Middle French (dict. 1850) → French
American (edu. 1816; later including components from Northwest European sign languages)
International finger-spelling group: Norway, Finland, Germany, US
Old Brazilian → Brazil, Argentina, Mexico

Wittmann (1991) and later research 
Henri Wittmann (1991) has been influential in scholarly attempts at constructing the French Sign Language family tree. He listed most of the following suspected members of the family, with date of establishment or earliest attestation. Subsequent scholarly research has confirmed most of his conclusions, but rejected others and expanded the family tree with new branches, while removing others.

French Sign Language (1752; may be different from Old French Sign Language)
Austro-Hungarian Sign Language (1780; now seen as separate Austrian Sign Language and Hungarian Sign Language)
Czech Sign Language (1786)
Ukrainian Sign Language (1805)
Russian Sign Language (1806)
Bulgarian Sign Language (1920)
probably Estonian Sign Language (1866)
Slovak Sign Language
Slovenian Sign Language (1840)
Croatian Sign Language (1885)
possibly Israeli Sign Language (1934) (but German Sign Language may be a stronger possibility)
Belgian Sign Language ( – ), split during the federalisation of Belgium
Flemish Sign Language ( – present)
French Belgian Sign Language ( – present)
Dutch Sign Language (1799)
Danish Sign Language (1806)
Norwegian Sign Language (1825)
Malagasy Sign Language (1950)
Icelandic Sign Language (split ca. 1910)
 Faroese Sign Language (1960)
Latvian Sign Language (1806)
Philippine Sign Language (1806?) (frequently attributed to American Sign Language)
American Sign Language (1817, with possible local admixture)
Puerto Rican Sign Language (1907)
Thai Sign Language (1951, creolized with indigenous sign).
Ghanaian Sign Language (1957)
Nigerian Sign Language (1960)
Kuala Lumpur Sign Language (1960?; now Malaysian Sign Language?)
Bolivian Sign Language (1973; a dialect of American Sign Language)
Moroccan Sign Language (1987?)
Black American Sign Language
and "Eskimo Sign Language"? (dubious: the indigenous Inuit Sign Language is an isolate)
A mixture of LSF and ASL may have given rise to
Quebec Sign Language (1817)
Greek Sign Language (with local admixture)
Italian Sign Language (1828)
Tunisian Sign Language (with local admixture)
Irish Sign Language (1846)
Mexican Sign Language (1869)
Algerian Sign Language (undated)
Romanian Sign Language (undated)
and, perhaps,
Catalan Sign Language (undated, but early)

Post-1991 modifications
Wittnann believed Lyons Sign Language, Spanish Sign Language, Brazilian Sign Language, and Venezuelan Sign Language, which are sometimes counted in the French family, had separate origins, though with some contact through stimulus diffusion, and it was Lyons rather than French Sign Language that gave rise to Belgian Sign Language. Chilean Sign Language (1852) has also been included in the French family but is not listed by Wittmann. Hawaiian Pidgin Sign Language (with possible local admixture) turned out to be an isolate, unrelated to French, American, or any other Sign Language. J. Albert Bickford concluded that there was 'no substantive evidence that the [Lyons Sign Language] ever existed' and retired it from Ethnologue in 2017.

See also
BANZSL

References

 
Deaf culture